Hero Killers is an Eagle Award winning comic book written by Andy Winter and illustrated by Declan Shalvey. It was published by Moonface Press.

Hero Killers was voted Favourite British Black and White Comicbook of 2006 at the Eagle Awards at the 2007 Comic Expo in Bristol.

References

External links 

 Moonface Press

Reviews

 IndieReview
 Hero Killing, Comics Bulletin
 Review, Ain't It Cool News

Interviews

 Declan Shalvey & Andy Winter: Hero Creators, Comics Bulletin 
 Andy Winter and Declan Shalvey: Writer and Artist of Hero Killer

British comics titles
British small press comics